or  is a village in the municipality of Hamarøy in Nordland county, Norway.

References

Hamarøy
Villages in Nordland
Populated places of Arctic Norway